The Professional Football League of America (PFLA) was an American football minor league that operated in the Midwest region of the United States from 1965 through 1967. With franchises based in the Midwest, the league played three seasons before merging some teams into the Continental Football League.

History
The Professional Football League of America began play in 1965. The Des Moines Warriors, Grand Rapids Blazers, Joliet Explorers, Lincoln Comets, Omaha Mustangs and Rock Island Raiders were charter members of the league. The Professional Football League of America evolved from the disbanded United Football League, and began play in the fall of 1965. The Joliet Explorers swept the Grand Rapids Blazers in a two–game championship series.

In 1966, the Rock Island Raiders franchise moved to neighboring Davenport, Iowa and changed names to become the "Quad City Raiders." The Lincoln Comets franchise did not return to league play. The Omaha Mustangs won the 1966 PFLA championship game, defeating the Des Moines Warriors 27–7 at home with 4,530 in attendance.

In their final season of play, the Pro Football League of America expanded, adding the Alabama Hawks, Chicago Owls and Oklahoma City Plainsmen franchises. The 1967 league played in two divisions. In May 1967, the Joliet franchise became an affiliate of the San Diego Chargers of the American Football League and changed their moniker to become the "Joliet Chargers" for the 1967 season. The 1967 Des Moines Warriors were an affiliate of the Minnesota Vikings. In 1967, the Alabama Hawks won the Western Division with a 9–3 record and hosted the PFLA's championship game at Milton Frank Stadium, losing 31–20 to the Joliet Chargers, who had won the Eastern Division with a 10–2 record.

The PFLA permanently folded following the 1967 season. In February 1968, the Continental Football League expanded to include some of the Pro Football League of America teams and continued play. The merger allowed the Continental Football League to expand into the midwestern United States. The Des Moines and Joliet Franchises did not join the league.

Season by season

1965 Professional Football League of America
W = Wins, L = Losses, T = Ties, PCT= Winning Percentage, PF= Points For, PA = Points Against

 = League Champion

1966 Professional Football League of America
W = Wins, L = Losses, T = Ties, PCT= Winning Percentage, PF= Points For, PA = Points Against

 = League Champion

1967 Professional Football League of America
W = Wins, L = Losses, T = Ties, PCT= Winning Percentage, PF= Points For, PA = Points Against

 = Division Champion

See also
 List of leagues of American football

References 

Defunct American football leagues in the United States
Sports leagues established in 1965
Sports leagues disestablished in 1967